"Precious" is a song composed by Paul Weller and performed by the British band The Jam.

Details 
It appeared on The Jam's 1982 album, The Gift, and also as a double A-side single along with "Town Called Malice". It reached number one in the UK Singles Chart, although the song received much less airplay than "Town Called Malice".  It was a departure for the band from their punk and mod roots, involving a funk-like sound that the band had not previously explored. Uncut described the track as "hypnotically itchy punk-funk". Some fans and critics have noticed the song contains a number of similarities to "Papa's Got a Brand New Pigbag", which was a relatively new release itself at the time. Weller himself was to admit in 1998 he had used that song as part of the inspiration for "Precious".

References

1982 songs
Songs written by Paul Weller
The Jam songs
UK Singles Chart number-one singles